HMS C33 was one of 38 C-class submarines built for the Royal Navy in the first decade of the 20th century. The boat sank with all hands on 4 August 1915 after hitting a mine.

Design and description
The C-class boats of the 1907–08 and subsequent Naval Programmes were modified to improve their speed, both above and below the surface. They displaced  on the surface and  submerged. The C-class submarines had a crew of two officers and fourteen ratings.

For surface running, the boats were powered by a single 12-cylinder  Vickers petrol engine that drove one propeller shaft. When submerged the propeller was driven by a  electric motor. They could reach  on the surface and  underwater.

The boats were armed with two 18-inch (45 cm) torpedo tubes in the bow. They could carry a pair of reload torpedoes, but generally did not as they would have to remove an equal weight of fuel in compensation.

Construction and career
HMS C33 was built by HM Dockyard Chatham. She was laid down on 29 March 1909 and was commissioned on 13 August 1910. C33 was involved in the U-boat trap tactic. The tactic was to use a decoy trawler to tow a submarine. When a U-boat was sighted, the tow line and communication line was slipped and the submarine would attack the U-boat. The tactic was partly successful, but it was abandoned after the loss of two C class submarines. In both cases, all the crew were lost.

C33 was one of the two C class submarines lost while employing this tactic. She was mined off Great Yarmouth while operating with the armed trawler Malta on 4 August 1915.

Notes

References

External links
 HMS C33 Roll of Honour
 'Submarine losses 1904 to present day' - Royal Navy Submarine Museum 

 

British C-class submarines
Royal Navy ship names
World War I shipwrecks in the North Sea
Lost submarines of the United Kingdom
Maritime incidents in 1915
Ships sunk by mines
1910 ships
Ships lost with all hands